Anonymous Content (AC) is an American entertainment company founded in 1999 by CEO Steve Golin. It is based in Los Angeles with offices in Culver City, New York City and London.

History 
Anonymous Content was founded in 1999 by CEO Steve Golin. In 2001, negotiations occurred for it to merge with Ridley Scott Associates, but no deal was reached. In 2002, AC made its first foray into television with Crime & Punishment, a reality show that ran for three seasons on NBC.

In May 2011, it was announced that AC's talent management division had added managers Tony Lipp, Sandra Chang and Doug Wald, who brought several major talents with them.

In March 2014, AC appointed David Fierson as Head of Business Operations. In May, it signed a three-year first look production deal with Paramount Television, where Paramount would produce and distribute scripted programming developed by AC. Michael Sugar became a partner of the company.

In September 2015, Alix Madigan left AC and joined Broad Green Pictures, previously working staff producer.

In January 2016, AC signed a deal with MBC Group's 03 Productions to advise them on developing and producing Arabic and English-language content. In February, Kevin Cotter was hired as Director of Literary Affairs at the company's New York office, where he would oversee researching books, articles and other intellectual property for development and production. More recently, Dawn Olmsead was invited to join the company after leaving Universal Content Productions.

In-development projects

Television projects 
In October 2021, AC announced it would adapt Lillian Hellman's play The Children's Hour into a television series, with Bess Wohl writing the screenplay. It also announced that it would adapt Ursula Le Guin's 1974 novel The Dispossessed as a series.

Catalog

Films

Television

References 

1999 establishments in California
Film production companies of the United States
Television production companies of the United States
American companies established in 1999
Entertainment companies established in 1999
Entertainment companies based in California
Companies based in Culver City, California